Stanley Arthur Tomlin (16 September 1905 – 1969) was an English long-distance runner who competed in the 1930 British Empire Games.

At 1930 Empire Games he won the gold medal in the 3 miles event. He also participated in the 6 miles competition.

Published works
1956 - Olympic Odyssey.Published by Modern Athlete Publications
Ltd., Croydon.

References

External links
commonwealthgames.com results

1905 births
1969 deaths
English male long-distance runners
Commonwealth Games gold medallists for England
Commonwealth Games medallists in athletics
Athletes (track and field) at the 1930 British Empire Games
Medallists at the 1930 British Empire Games